The term archaic Homo sapiens has different meanings depending on the preferred system of taxonomy.
See Human taxonomy for the question of taxonomic classification of early human varieties.

Archaic Homo sapiens may refer to:
early forms of anatomically modern humans
transitional forms of archaic humans possessing some of the derived traits of modern humans

See also
Human subspecies
Homo sapiens
Jebel Irhoud
Florisbad Skull
Neanderthal
Denisovan
Homo rhodesiensis
Homo heidelbergensis
Homo antecessor
Homo ergaster
Homo sapiens idaltu
Omo remains
Skhul and Qafzeh hominins
Peștera cu Oase
Red Deer Cave people
Homo naledi
European early modern humans